The Kazakh democracy movement is a series of political movements in Kazakhstan that are supported by opposition groups and civil activists which are seeking for reforms in Kazakhstan's current political system, formed from 1991 after the country gained its independence from the Soviet Union and became a sovereign state by advocating for a democratic, multi-party, parliamentary system.

The movement dates back to 1986, when a group of Kazakh youth demonstrated against Gennady Kolbin's appointment as the First Secretary of the Communist Party of Kazakhstan due to his ethnicity which resulted in protests throughout the Kazakh SSR in an event known as Jeltoqsan and was eventually followed by the calls for the country's independence amid the dissolution of the Soviet Union. Nursultan Nazarbayev would eventually become the President of Kazakhstan and serve for three decades under authoritarian regime.

Over the recent years, calls for democratic reforms have grew following the decrease in standard of living which saw rise of consistent protests in Kazakhstan that eventually resulted in Nazarbayev's resignation as well as attempted reforms by the authorities which are seen as flawed and lacking among the general public.

Background 

In December 1986, well-known and long-time First Secretary of the Central Committee of the Communist Party of Kazakhstan Dinmukhamed Kunaev was dismissed from his post and was replaced by Gennady Kolbin, an ethnic Russian which received discontent among the Kazakh public. Riots and clashes between protestors and police broke out on 17 December at the Brezhnev Square (now Republic Square) in Almaty and eventually spread to other parts in the city. As result, 168–200 people were killed and more than 200 were injured with large detentions taking place.

In June 1989, Kolbin was replaced by ethnic Kazakh, Nursultan Nazarbayev, who previously served as the Chairman of the Council of Ministers. After Nazarbayev's rise to power, Kazakhstan experienced in the rise of authoritarianism and corruption which faced opposition movements that were met with political repressions, eventually leading to a decline in civil activism and opposition in the country.

History

1990's

1989–1991 

In the aftermath of Jeltoqsan event, a new aspect of political life in Kazakhstan as new nationalist movements such as Azat, Jeltoqsan and Alash began to form which called for independence from the Soviet Union and the anti-nuclear Nevada Semipalatinsk movement led by Olzhas Suleimenov sought for closure of the Semipalatinsk Test Site. Rallies and demonstration were held in the country and independent media began to appear, as well as increased price of goods which led to inflation.

1991 presidential election 

On 16 October 1991, President Nursultan Nazarbayev signed decree setting for the country's first direct presidential elections to be held for 1 December. The Supreme Soviet proposed People's Congress of Kazakhstan leader, anti-nuclear activist Olzhas Suleimenov for candidacy to which he declined to run himself. Hasen Qojahmetov, leader of the Jeltoqsan National Democratic Party expressed his desire to join the race, however the requirement for collecting 100,000 signatures for registration was unusually higher to which Qojahmetov as a result wasn't able to collect, claiming that parts of the signatures were stolen by the police. Nazarbayev appeared alone on the ballot and won 98% of the vote in what was seen as a sham election.

1992–1995 

In June 1992, demonstrations were held in Alma-Ata by the Azat, Jeltoqsan and Alash parties which called for the resignation of former Communist officials within the government, specifically President Nursultan Nazarbayev. An estimated of 5,000 persons participated in 17 June rally with Nazarbayev himself claiming that the situation would lead to a "complete split in society."

Following the 1994 Kazakh legislative elections where newly formed political parties for the first time were allowed to participate, some parties such as the nationalist ones boycotted the elections while the Communist Party of Kazakhstan itself was barred from participating. In the result, four major pro-presidential parties occupied the seats in the Supreme Council although it created some form of a multi-party system within the Parliament. The opposition criticized the elections as not meeting democratic standards.

In March 1995, followed by the decision from the Constitutional Court, Nazarbayev dissolved the Supreme Council. This led to dissatisfaction amongst the 72 MP's whom went on a three-day hunger strike while several MP's even refused to leave the Parliament House, warning of the growth of authoritarianism and political repression that would happen within the country by expanding executive branch's power.

1996 
Protest against Nazarbayev's policies was held on 8 December 1996 which was barely mentioned in Kazakh media. According to journalists, around 3500 persons participated in the demonstration which lasted for about three hours.

2000's

Democratic Choice of Kazakhstan (2001) 
On 17 November 2001, several known Kazakh officials and businessmen announced the creation of the Democratic Choice of Kazakhstan (QDT) where it revealed its policies of empowering parliament, direct elections for regional authorities, introducing election and judiciary reforms as well as granting more freedom to the media.

A sanctioned rally by the QDT with a support by the Communist Party of Kazakhstan (QKP) was held in Almaty on 20 January 2002. The QDT called for a referendum on the need to continue democratic reforms, stronger role for the Parliament in control of the government and Prosecutor General's Office, direct elections of äkıms and the development of local government. An estimated 2000–5000 people attended the demonstration.

2005 presidential election 

In the aftermath of the 2004 Kazakh legislative elections, the Coordinating Council of Democratic Forces of Kazakhstan was created on 15 October 2004 by the initiative of Ak Zhol Democratic Party, Communist Party of Kazakhstan and the Democratic Choice of Kazakhstan. Its purpose was to coordinate actions and consolidate the efforts of democratic forces to implement political reforms in Kazakhstan by uniting efforts of political parties, public associations and other organizations, social and political figures of the country to create a union of democratic forces of Kazakhstan. 
In March 2005, a political alliance For a Just Kazakhstan was formed and along with the Coordinating Council, former Mazhilis Chairman Zharmakhan Tuyakbay was nominated by to be the only opposition presidential candidate. At the 2005 Kazakh presidential elections, Tuyakbay swept just 6.6% of the vote and refused to concede the race, citing electoral fraud that was committed by the Central Election Commission.

Killing of Sarsenbaiūly (2006) 
On 13 February 2006, Nağyz Ak Zhol co-chairman Altynbek Sarsenbaiuly was found shot dead in his car along with his bodyguard and driver. An unsanctioned opposition rally was held in Almaty on 26 February where 1000 people demanded the justice for Sarsenbaiuly's death.

After the Almaty Regional Court found the leaders of  For a Just Kazakhstan and Alğa! parties guilty for illegally organising event, a hunger strike was then held in response to the court's decision on 1 March 2006.

A rally in memory of Sarsenbaiuly was held at the Şoqan Uälihanov Square in Almaty on 10 February 2007, where little more than 1000 demonstrators paid respects to Sarsenbaiuly. This marked the first time that a sanctioned demonstration was held in the city center and not in the outskirts.

2010's

2012 

Following the Zhanaozen massacre and 2012 legislative elections, around 200 people protested in Almaty against the election results, citing voter fraud on 17 January 2012.

On 28 January, 300–1000 people gathered in Republic Square in an unsanctioned rally, demanding for democratic change and a transparent investigation regarding the Zhanaozen riots.

Re-establishment of the QDT and 2018–2020 Kazakh protests 

In April 2017, exiled Kazakh banker Mukhtar Ablyazov announced the re-establishment of the Democratic Choice of Kazakhstan (QDT). From 2018, the QDT held unsanctioned rallies throughout Kazakhstan aimed at resignation of the government, end of corruption, as well as the transformation from the presidential system to parliamentary republic. Protests became intensified from February 2019, after a fire burned down apartment building killing five children.

2019 presidential election 

Clashes between protestors and police broke out on 9 June 2019 in Almaty and Nur-Sultan following the 2019 presidential elections where President Nursultan Nazarbayev's handpicked successor Kassym-Jomart Tokayev won 71% of the vote in which the protestors claimed to been as not free or fair. The opposition prior to that, called for boycott in the elections while Tokayev's challenger, Amirjan Qosanov, whom proclaimed himself to be an opposition candidate, was seen as compromised figure. Tokayev in response to the situation blamed poverty for the sole cause of protests and promised that the government would address the social and economic problems within the country.

2020's

2022 Kazakh protests 

In January 2022, massive protests took place against a sudden increase in the price of LPG, widely used as a fuel. The protests extended to calls for political reforms, and the Cabinet led by Askar Mamin resigned en masse.

References 

 
Democracy movements by country
Politics of Kazakhstan